Guidance Patrol is a 2012 Iranian comedy film directed by Saeed Soheili. The movie depicts three urban working poor young men who impersonate crew of a Guidance Patrol to earn money.

Dealing with a national issue, the movie soon sparked controversy in Iran and eventually was pulled from screens.

Ahmad Khatami called it "obscene" and "immoral" in Tehran's friday prayer speech. Ansar-e Hezbollah protested outside the Ministry of Culture and Islamic Guidance building and set a 48-hour deadline for suspending the screening of the movie. Islamic Propagation Organization's Art Center, one of main proprietors of movie theatres in Iran, refused to screen the movie in its all 62 cinemas in order to "observe its duties in the protection of social and ideological values" because the movie "targeted Islamic morality and family decency".

Though it was only able to screen in 15 movie theatres, it enjoyed a strong opening and became the box office number-one for Nowruz before getting banned after 31 days. Surpassed by Kolah Ghermezi and Bache Naneh and I Feel Sleepy, it became the third highest-grossing film screened in Iran in 1391 SH.

Sequel
Saeed Soheili made two sequels for this movie, Guidance Patrol 2 and Guidance Patrol 3 in 2017 and 2020.

Awards and nominations

References

External links 

Guidance Patrol (Gasht-e Ershad)  at the Farabi Cinema Foundation

2010s police comedy films
Films set in Iran
Iranian comedy films
2012 films
2012 comedy films